Harvey Yunis is an American classicist and the Andrew W. Mellon Professor of Classics at Rice University. He is an eminent scholar of Greek rhetoric, tragedy, and political thought. He has taught at Rice University since 1987.

Education 
Yunis graduated summa cum laude from Dartmouth College in 1978. In 1982, he earned a B.Phil from Cambridge University at Jesus College in Classical Tripos with first class honours. He earned his PhD in Classical Philology from Harvard University in 1987 writing his dissertation on “Athenian Polis Religion and Euripides: Fundamental Religious Beliefs in Life and Fiction.”

Career 
Initially focusing on Religion in Euripidian tragedies, Yunis turned his focus to Ancient Greek political thought. He published works on law and politics in 4th century Athens. He then focused on rhetoric, examining rhetoric's function in the Athenian polis and how it shaped law and customs. Apart from commentaries, he has also published numerous translations of classical works including Plato's Phaedrus and Demosthenes' On the Crown. In the early 2000's, the original fragments from On the Crown, were sent to him to be studied through a process of philological, historical and literary analysis. These recently discovered papyrus fragments constitute the earliest available evidence for the text and are only about 80 to 100 years removed from the original composition, which is a rare phenomenon for any classical author. He also co-authored a translation of Aristotle's Rhetoric with Robin Waterfield in 2018.

Apart from his scholarly career, Yunis was also the Chair of the Department of Classical Studies at Rice University for ten years, where he developed the department and attracted some of the nations most brilliant classicist to the university.

Books 

 Ed., Albert Henrichs, Greek Myth and Religion: Collected Papers II (Berlin: DeGruyter, 2019).
 Ed. and trans. with Robin Waterfield, Aristotle: The Art of Rhetoric (Oxford: Oxford University Press, 2018).
 Plato: Phaedrus (Cambridge: Cambridge University Press, 2011).
 Demosthenes, Speeches 18-19: On the Crown and On the Dishonest Embassy (Austin: University of Texas Press, 2005).
 Ed., Written Texts and the Rise of Literate Culture in Ancient Greece (Cambridge: Cambridge University Press, 2003). Paperback edition 2007.
 Demosthenes: On the Crown (Cambridge: Cambridge University Press, 2001).
 Taming Democracy: Models of Political Rhetoric in Classical Athens (Ithaca, NY: Cornell University Press, 1996).
 A New Creed: Fundamental Religious Beliefs in the Athenian Polis and Euripidean Drama (Göttingen: Vandenhoeck & Ruprecht, 1988).

References 

American classical scholars
Rice University faculty
Living people
Year of birth missing (living people)
Dartmouth College alumni
Harvard Graduate School of Arts and Sciences alumni
Alumni of Jesus College, Cambridge